Bernard Henrich (born 1952) is a German set decorator. He was nominated at the 88th Academy Awards in the category Best Production Design for his work on the film Bridge of Spies. His nomination was shared with Adam Stockhausen and Rena DeAngelo.

Selected filmography 
 Bridge of Spies (2015; co-nominated with Adam Stockhausen and Rena DeAngelo)

References

External links 

1952 births
Living people
People from Saarland
German set decorators